Ectaetia is a small genus of minute black scavenger flies (the family Scatopsidae). Known species are found in the Nearctic, Palearctic, Oriental, and Neotropical biogeographic realms. Adults of Ectaetia species are generally shiny and black, up to 7 mm long.

References 

Scatopsidae
Nematoceran flies of Europe
Psychodomorpha genera